was a  after Tentoku and before Kōhō. This period spanned the years from February 961 through  July 964.

Change of era
 January 20, 961 : The new era name was created to mark an event or series of events. The previous era ended and the new one commenced in Tentoku 5, on the 16th day of the 2nd month.

Events of the Ōwa era
 961 (Ōwa 1, 11th month): Emperor Murakami moved into a newly constructed palace which had to be re-built after the destructive fire of Tentoku 5 (960).
 962 (Ōwa 2, 2nd month):  The emperor sent deputies to make offerings at number of Shinto shrines—at Ise, at Kamo, at Mizunoo, at Hirano, and at Kasuga.
 962 (Ōwa 2, 8th month): Fujiwara no Saneyori went to offer prayers at the Iwashimizu Shrine; and many from the Fujiwara clan followed his example.

Notes

References
 Brown, Delmer M. and Ichirō Ishida, eds. (1979).  Gukanshō: The Future and the Past. Berkeley: University of California Press. ;  OCLC 251325323
 Nussbaum, Louis-Frédéric and Käthe Roth. (2005).  Japan encyclopedia. Cambridge: Harvard University Press. ;  OCLC 58053128
 Titsingh, Isaac. (1834). Nihon Ōdai Ichiran; ou,  Annales des empereurs du Japon.  Paris: Royal Asiatic Society, Oriental Translation Fund of Great Britain and Ireland. OCLC 5850691
 Varley, H. Paul. (1980). A Chronicle of Gods and Sovereigns: Jinnō Shōtōki of Kitabatake Chikafusa. New York: Columbia University Press. ;  OCLC 6042764

External links
 National Diet Library, "The Japanese Calendar" -- historical overview plus illustrative images from library's collection

Japanese eras